Acroceuthes metaxanthana is a moth of the family Tortricidae. It is found in Australia.

External links
 Acroceuthes metaxanthana at tortricidae.com

Archipini
Moths described in 1863
Moths of Australia
Taxa named by Francis Walker (entomologist)